EE Ltd v Office of Communications [2017] EWCA Civ 1873 is a UK enterprise law case, concerning telecommunications.

Facts
EE Ltd claimed that Ofcom’s decision to set licence fees for 900 MHz and 1800 MHz bands of radio spectrum for mobile phones wrongly interpreted its powers. Under the Wireless Telegraphy Act 2006 s 5 the Secretary of State could give Ofcom directions about performing its functions. It issued the Wireless Telegraphy Act 2006 (Directions to OFCOM) Order 2010, where art 6 required Ofcom to revise its annual licence fees for 900MHz and 1800MHz bands to reflect full market value, and conduct an auction. In 2015, Ofcom decided the new licence fees by reference to their best possible alternative use, or scarcity value, as opposed to a ‘costs recovery’ basis. This meant licence fees charged to EE Ltd went from £25m to £75m a year. EE Ltd argued this wrongly excluded considerations in the Communications Framework Directive 2002/21 article 8, requiring a National Regulatory Authority (i.e. Ofcom) to (1) promote competition, (2) develop the internal market, and (3) promote EU citizen interests (4) apply objective, transparent, non-discriminatory and proportionate principles. Ofcom admitted it failed to consider article 8 criteria, in an impact assessment because it argued its discretion was eliminated by the Secretary of State's direction.

Judgment

High Court
Cranston J held Ofcom correctly interpreted art 6 of the Order, requiring full market value. Once the SS had issued a direction under WTA 2006 s 5, Ofcom’s duties under the Directive were replaced by the Direction.

Court of Appeal
The Court of Appeal held that art 8 considerations were not taken into account, and they ought to have been. The Secretary of State was not authorised by WTA 2006 section 5 to direct Ofcom to ignore its statutory duties under the Directive. They were non-delegable. Nor could the Secretary of State relieve Ofcom of its statutory duties. This meant Ofcom would have to reconsider its decision taking into account article 8. Delegated legislation should be read to avoid a conclusion that it is ultra vires: Raymond v Honey [1983] 1 AC 1. The word ‘reflect’ should mean ‘set by reference to’ as Ofcom argued, which meant art 6 did not exclude the art 8 considerations from Ofcom’s decision on the licence fee. Therefore Ofcom failed to give effect to the Direction, as properly construed, and would have to reconsider the fees it had set.

Henderson LJ and Asplin LJ agreed.

See also

United Kingdom enterprise law
EU law

Notes

References

United Kingdom enterprise case law